Oedura murrumanu, also called the limestone range velvet gecko, is a gecko endemic to Australia.

References

Oedura
Reptiles described in 2014
Taxa named by Paul M. Oliver
Taxa named by Rebecca J. Laver
Taxa named by Jane Melville
Taxa named by Paul Doughty
Geckos of Australia